The Progressive Movement is a minor opposition political party in Cameroon. It was formed on 23 August 1991 and is led by Jean-Jacques Ekindi.

Ekindi was the MP candidate in the October 1992 presidential election, officially receiving 0.79% of the vote and placing fifth.

An MP meeting at the Bepanda Omnisport Stadium in Douala on 21 May 1994 was banned by the government, and when party members tried to hold the meeting anyway, a number of them were beaten by security forces.

Again running as the party's presidential candidate in the 11 October 2004 presidential election, Ekindi announced his withdrawal from the election on 10 October in favor of John Fru Ndi, the candidate of the main opposition party, the Social Democratic Front (SDF). His name nevertheless remained on the ballot, and he placed 13th out of 16 candidates with 0.27% of the vote.

In the 22 July 2007 parliamentary election, Ekindi was elected to the National Assembly as an MP candidate from Wouri Centre constituency in Littoral Province, where the MP received 22.43% of the vote and one of the three available seats. Ekindi was the only member of his party to win a seat in the 2007 election. Shortly before the election, on 18 July 2007, the MP formalized an alliance with the Cameroonian Democratic Union (UDC); as part of this agreement, the parties decided not to run candidates in the same constituencies. Also at the time of the election, the alliance between the MP and the SDF collapsed because, according to Ekindi, the SDF decided to run candidates in Wouri Centre and ignored the alliance.

References

×

Political parties established in 1991
Political parties in Cameroon
1991 establishments in Cameroon